Neff Elementary School can refer to:
 Pat Neff Elementary School in Houston, Texas
 Neff Elementary School in Manheim Township, Lancaster County, Pennsylvania
 Neff Elementary School in Miamisburg, Ohio